University Technical College Leeds is a university technical college (UTC) in Hunslet, Leeds, England, which opened in September 2016. The UTC is sponsored by the University of Leeds and several local employers.

The college forms part of an educational hub in the north of Hunslet, with Leeds City College's Printworks Campus using the former Alf Cooke printworks building, Leeds College of Building's Cudbear Street site, and the Ruth Gorse Academy  all in close proximity to each other.

The college is based in a formerly disused part of Braime Pressings' factory on Hunslet Road.

References

External links

Leeds
Secondary schools in Leeds
Educational institutions established in 2016
2016 establishments in England